Chet D. Traylor (born October 12, 1945) is a former Associate Justice of the Louisiana Supreme Court, having served in that capacity from 1997 to 2009.

Traylor announced his candidacy for the supreme court prior to the January 1996 qualifying period.

References

External links
 
Campaign contributions at OpenSecrets.org
Chet Traylor at Judgepedia
Chet Traylor at OutCampaigns.com

1945 births
Living people
Justices of the Louisiana Supreme Court
Politicians from Monroe, Louisiana
People from Winnsboro, Louisiana
People from Columbia, Louisiana
Louisiana Republicans
Louisiana lawyers
University of Louisiana at Monroe alumni
Loyola University New Orleans College of Law alumni
American police detectives
United States Army soldiers
American United Methodists